Air Afrique came into being in  as a joint venture between Air France, Union Aéromaritime de Transport (UAT), and eleven former French-speaking colonies in Western and Central Africa, namely Cameroon, Central African Republic, Chad, Republic of the Congo, Dahomey, Gabon, Ivory Coast, Mauritania, Niger, Senegal, and Upper Volta. Initially, the company inaugurated its services flying routes within those countries, and linking them as well. On 5 January 1962, the carrier inaugurated its first intercontinental flights with Boeing 707s leased from Air France serving the Paris–Dakar–Abidjan and Paris–Douala–Brazzaville routes.

The airline ceased operations in 2002. Following is a list of destinations the airline served all through its history. All destinations shown are currently terminated. Each destination is provided with the country name, the name of the airport served, and both its International Air Transport Association (IATA) three-letter designator (IATA airport code) and its International Civil Aviation Organization (ICAO) four-letter designator (ICAO airport code). The list also includes the airports that served either as a hub or as a focus city for the carrier, as well as the destinations served at the time of closure.

List

References 



Defunct airlines of Benin
Defunct airlines of Burkina Faso
Defunct airlines of the Central African Republic
Defunct airlines of Chad
Defunct airlines of the Republic of the Congo
Defunct airlines of Ivory Coast
Defunct airlines of Mali
Defunct airlines of Mauritania
Defunct airlines of Niger
Defunct airlines of Senegal
Defunct airlines of Togo
Airlines established in 1961
Airlines disestablished in 2002